Jesse Wayne Johnson (born December 7, 1982) is an American actor. He is the son of actors Don Johnson and Patti D'Arbanville.

Early life
Johnson was born on December 7, 1982 in Los Angeles to actors Don Johnson and Patti D'Arbanville, and was raised in Aspen, Colorado. His parents separated when he was three years old. He has seven half-siblings, including the actress Dakota Johnson.

Career 
In 2001, Jesse made his acting debut in a guest appearance of the CBS television series Nash Bridges, in the episode "Quack Fever". In 2003, he appeared as Young Lt. Benjamin Tyson in the made-for-television film Word of Honor. Jesse majored in theater at Occidental College, in Los Angeles, and graduated in 2004.

He made his feature film debut as Jason in the film Redline, starring alongside Nathan Phillips and Eddie Griffin.  The film was released April 13, 2007 and debuted at #11 on the US Box Office Chart and earned $6.8 million worldwide. The film's critical reaction was extremely negative. One critic called it "idiotic".

Also in 2007, he began filming a low budget independent Australian horror film called Prey. The film, starring Natalie Bassingthwaighte, had a limited release in Australia. Labelled a box office bomb, it earned a lifetime gross of just over A$700.00  and was panned by critics. Jake Wilson, reviewing the film for The Age in May, 2009, said: "A film that aims so low and fails so miserably deserves nothing but contempt". The DVD was released in October 2009, both in Australia by Paramount in 2010, and in the US by Xenon in 2011.

Jesse starred as Damon in the Paramount Digital Entertainment-produced Circle of Eight, which aired exclusively on Myspace.com. Alongside Rachel Hunter, he appeared in the independent film My Life: Untitled (released in 2010) as Bobby. He also starred in the indie comedy Head Over Spurs in Love (2010) as Bubba.

In 2012, he starred in the Spanish TV series Con el culo al aire, in the role of Bobby, a young American from a billionaire's family. His most recent work was in the National Geographic Channel's airing of Killing Lincoln (2013), in which he portrayed John Wilkes Booth – the actor who assassinated the 16th American president, Abraham Lincoln. His performance has been received with good reviews, with many considering it to be his "breakout role". He played the 'Young Earl McGraw' in season 2 of the El Rey series From Dusk Till Dawn aired in September 2015.

Filmography

Film

Television

References

External links

1982 births
Living people
American male film actors
American male television actors
Place of birth missing (living people)
American male screenwriters
Occidental College alumni
21st-century American male actors
Griffith family